Wiesbaden is a city in central western Germany and the capital of the state of Hesse. , it had 290,955 inhabitants, plus approximately 21,000 United States citizens (mostly associated with the United States Army). The Wiesbaden urban area is home to approximately 560,000 people. Wiesbaden is the second-largest city in Hesse after Frankfurt am Main.

The city, together with nearby Frankfurt am Main, Darmstadt, and Mainz, is part of the Frankfurt Rhine Main Region, a metropolitan area with a combined population of about 5.8 million people.

Wiesbaden is one of the oldest spa towns in Europe. Its name translates to "meadow baths", a reference to its famed hot springs. It is also internationally famous for its architecture and climate—it is also called the "Nice of the North" in reference to the city in France. At one time, Wiesbaden had 26 hot springs. , fourteen of the springs are still flowing.

In 1970, the town hosted the tenth Hessentag Landesfest (English: Hessian Day, a state festival).

The city is considered the tenth richest in Germany (2014) boasting 110.3% of the national average gross domestic product in 2017. The average annual buying power per citizen is €24,783.

Geographical setting

Wiesbaden is situated on the right (northern) bank of the Rhine, above the confluence of the Main, where the Rhine's main direction changes from north to west. The city is across the Rhine from Mainz, the capital of the state of Rhineland-Palatinate. To the north of the city are the Taunus Mountains, which trend in a northeasterly direction.

The landscape is formed by a wide lowland between the Taunus heights in the north, the Bierstadter Höhe and the Hainerberg in the east, the Mosbacher Mountain in the south, and the Schiersteiner Mountain in the west, an offshoot of the Taunus range.

The downtown is drained only by the narrow valley of the Salzbach, a tributary of the Rhine, on the eastern flanks of the Mosbacher Mountain. The city's main railway line and the Mainz road (Mainzer Straße) follow this valley. Several other streams drain into the Salzbach within the city center: the Wellritzbach, the Kesselbach, the Schwarzbach, the Dambach, and the Tennelbach, as well as the outflow of many thermal and mineral springs in the Kurhaus (spa) district. Above the city center, the Salzbach is better known as the Rambach.

In the north are vast forest areas, which cover 27.4% of the urban area. In the west and east are vineyards and agricultural land, which cover 31.1% of the area. Of the municipality's -long border, the Rhine makes up .

Climate
Wiesbaden has a temperate-oceanic climate (Köppen: Cfb) with relatively cold winters and warm summers.

History

Classical antiquity
While evidence of settlement at present-day Wiesbaden dates back to the Neolithic era, historical records document continuous occupancy after the erection of a Roman fort in 6 AD which housed an auxiliary cavalry unit. The thermal springs of Wiesbaden are first mentioned in Pliny the Elder's Naturalis Historia. They were famous for their recreation pools for Roman army horses and possibly as the source of a mineral used for red hair dye (which was very fashionable around the turn of BC/AD among women in Rome).

The Roman settlement is first mentioned using the name Aquae Mattiacorum (Latin for "Waters of the Mattiaci") in 121. The Mattiaci were a Germanic tribe, possibly a branch of the neighboring Chatti, who lived in the vicinity at that time. The town also appears as Mattiacum in Ptolemy's Geographia (2.10). The Roman Empire built the Limes Germanicus, which was a line of Roman frontier fortifications in the Taunus. Wiesbaden is just south of the Taunus.

The capital of the province of Germania Superior, Mogontiacum (present-day Mainz), base of 2 (at times 3) Roman legions, was just over the Rhine and connected by a bridge at the present-day borough of Mainz-Kastel (Roman "castellum"), a strongly fortified bridgehead.

The Alamanni, a coalition of Germanic tribes from beyond the Limes, captured the fort around 260. Later, in the 370s, when the Romans and Alamanni were allied, the Alemanni gained control of the Wiesbaden area and were in charge of its defense against other Germanic tribes.

Middle Ages
After the Franks under Clovis I defeated the Alamanni in the Battle of Tolbiac in 496, the Franks eventually displaced the Alamanni in the Wiesbaden area over the course of the 6th century. In the 8th century, Wiesbaden became the site of a royal palace of the Frankish kingdom. The first documented use of the name Wiesbaden is by Einhard, the biographer of Charlemagne, whose writings mention "Wisabada" sometime between 828 and 830.

When the Frankish Carolingian Empire broke up in 888, Wiesbaden was in the eastern half, called East Francia (which would evolve into the Holy Roman Empire). The town was part of Franconia, the heartland of East Francia. In the 1170s, the Count of Nassau, Walram I, received the area around Wiesbaden as a fiefdom. When Franconia fragmented in the early 13th century, Nassau emerged as an independent state as part of the Holy Roman Empire.

In 1232 Wiesbaden became a Reichsstadt, an imperial city, of the Holy Roman Empire. However, in 1242, during the war of Emperor Frederick II against the Pope, the Archbishop of Mainz, Siegfried III, ordered the city's destruction.

Wiesbaden returned to the control of the House of Nassau in 1270 under Count Walram II, Count of Nassau. However, Wiesbaden and the castle at Sonnenberg were again destroyed in 1283 in conflict with Eppstein.

Walram's son and successor Adolf would later become king of Germany from 1292 until 1298. In 1329, under Adolf's son Gerlach I of Nassau-Weilburg the House of Nassau and thereby, Wiesbaden, received the right of coinage from Holy Roman Emperor Louis the Bavarian.

In 1355, the County of Nassau-Weilburg was divided among the sons of Gerlach. The County of Nassau's holdings would be subdivided many times among heirs, with the parts being brought together again whenever a line died out. Wiesbaden became the seat of the County of Nassau-Wiesbaden under Count Adolf I (1307–1370), eldest son of Gerlach. It would eventually fall back to Nassau-Weilburg in 1605.

Modern era

Due to its participation in the uprisings of the German Peasants' War of 1525, Wiesbaden lost all its privileges for over 40 years. During this time, Wiesbaden became Protestant with the nomination of Wolf Denthener as first Lutheran pastor on January 1, 1543. The same day, the first Latin school was opened, preparing pupils for the gymnasium in Idstein. In 1566, the privileges of the city were restored.

The oldest remaining building of Wiesbaden, the old city hall, was built in 1609 and 1610. No older buildings are preserved due to two fires in 1547 and 1561. In 1648, at the end of the devastating Thirty Years' War, chronicles tell that Wiesbaden had barely 40 residents left. In 1659, the County of Nassau-Weilburg was divided again. Wiesbaden became part of the County of Nassau-Usingen. In 1744, the seat of Nassau-Usingen was moved to Biebrich. In 1771, the Count of Nassau-Usingen granted a concession for gambling in Wiesbaden. In 1810, the Wiesbaden Casino (German: Spielbank) was opened in the old Kurhaus. Gambling was later outlawed by Prussian authorities in 1872.

As a result of Napoleon's victory over Austria in the Battle of Austerlitz, the Holy Roman Empire was dissolved in 1805. On July 12, 1806, 16 states in present-day Germany, including the remaining counties of Nassau-Usingen and Nassau-Weilburg, formally left the Holy Roman Empire and joined in the Confederation of the Rhine. Napoleon was its "protector". Under pressure from Napoleon, both counties merged to form the Duchy of Nassau on August 30, 1806.

At the 1815 Congress of Vienna, the Duchy of Nassau joined the German Confederation. The capital of Nassau was moved from Weilburg to Wiesbaden, and the city became the ducal residence. Building activity started to give the city a magnificent appearance. Most of the historical center of Wiesbaden dates back to this time.

In the Revolutions of 1848, 30,000 citizens of Nassau assembled in Wiesbaden on March 4. They demanded a constitution from the Duke, which they received.

In the Austro-Prussian War of 1866, Nassau took Austria's side. This decision led to the end of the duchy. After the Austrian defeat, Nassau was annexed by Prussia and became part of the Prussian province of Hesse-Nassau. The deposed duke Adolph of Nassau in 1890 became the Grand Duke of Luxembourg (see House of Nassau). This turned out to be a fortunate change for the city, as it then became an international spa town. A rise in construction commenced after the aristocracy followed the lead of the Hohenzollern emperors, who began annual trips to Wiesbaden.

The period around the turn of the 20th century is regarded as the heyday of the city. Kaiser Wilhelm II visited the city regularly in summer, such that it became an unofficial "summer residence". The city was also popular among the Russian nobility. In the wake of the imperial court, numerous nobles, artists, and wealthy businessmen increasingly settled in the city. Many wealthy persons chose Wiesbaden as their retirement seat, as it offered leisure and medical treatment alike. In the latter part of the 19th century, Wiesbaden became the German city with the most millionaires.

In 1894, the present Hessian State Theater, designed by the Vienna architects Fellner and Helmer, was built on behalf of Kaiser Wilhelm II.

Weimar Republic and Third Reich (1919 to 1945)
After World War I, Wiesbaden fell under the Allied occupation of the Rhineland and was occupied by the French army in 1918. In 1921, the Wiesbaden Agreement on German reparations to France was signed in the city. In 1925, Wiesbaden became the headquarters of the British Army of the Rhine until the withdrawal of occupying forces from the Rhineland in 1930.

In 1929, an airport was constructed in Erbenheim on the site of a horse-racing track. In 1936, Fighter Squadron 53 of the Luftwaffe was stationed here.

In the Kristallnacht pogrom on November 10, 1938, Wiesbaden's large synagogue on Michelsberg was destroyed. The synagogue had been designed by Phillip Hoffmann and built in 1869. Another synagogue in Wiesbaden-Bierstadt was also destroyed. When the Nazis came to power in Germany, there were 2,700 Jews living in Wiesbaden. By June 1942 nearly all of them had been deported to the Nazi death camps in German-occupied Poland.

General Ludwig Beck from Wiesbaden was one of the planners of the July 20, 1944 assassination attempt of Adolf Hitler. Beck was designated by his fellow conspirators to be future Head of State (Regent) after elimination of Hitler. The plot failed, however, and Beck was forced to commit suicide. Today, the city annually awards the Ludwig Beck prize for civil courage in his honor.

Lutheran pastor and theologian Martin Niemöller, founder of the Confessing Church resistance movement against the Nazis, is an Honorary Citizen of Wiesbaden. He presented his last sermon before his arrest in Wiesbaden's Market Church.

World War II
In World War II, Wiesbaden was the headquarters for Germany's Wehrkreis XII. This military district included the Eifel, part of Hesse, the Palatinate, and the Saarland. After the Battle of France, this Wehrkreis was extended to include Lorraine, including Nancy, and the Grand Duchy of Luxembourg. The commander was General der Infanterie Walther Schroth.

Wehrkreis XII was made up of three subordinate regions: Bereich Hauptsitze Koblenz, Mannheim and Metz.

Bereich Hauptsitz Koblenz was the headquarters for 12 Unterregion-Hauptsitze, namely Trier I, Trier II, Koblenz, Neuwied, Kreuznach, Wiesbaden, Limburg an der Lahn, Lahn, Mainz, Worms, Darmstadt, and Luxembourg.
Bereich Hauptsitz Mannheim was the headquarters for 10 Unterregion-Hauptsitze, namely Saarlautern, Saarbrücken, St. Wendel, Zweibrücken, Kaiserslautern, Neustadt an der Weinstraße, Ludwigshafen (Rhein), Mannheim I, Mannheim II, and Heidelberg.
Bereich Hauptsitz Metz was the headquarters for Unterregion-Hauptsitze Metz, Diedenhofen (Thionville), and Saint-Avold.

During the war, Wiesbaden was, between August 1940 and the end of 1942, bombed by the Royal Air Force and from 1943 through to March 1945, was attacked by both RAF and United States Air Force bombers on 66 days. In the attacks, about 18% of the city's homes were destroyed. During the war, more than 25% of the city's buildings were damaged or worse and 1,700 people were killed.

Wiesbaden was captured by U.S. Army forces on March 28, 1945. The U.S. 317th Infantry Regiment attacked in assault boats across the Rhine from Mainz while the 319th Infantry attacked across the river Main near Hochheim am Main. The attack started at 0100 and by early afternoon the two forces of the 80th U.S. Infantry Division had linked up with the loss of only three dead and three missing. The Americans captured 900 German soldiers and a warehouse full of 4,000 cases of champagne.

After the war's end, American rock artist Elvis Presley was stationed in Friedberg and often visited Wiesbaden.

Cold War and contemporary history
After World War II, the state of Hesse was established (see Greater Hesse), and Wiesbaden became its capital, though nearby Frankfurt am Main is much larger and works as Hesse's economic and financial centre. Wiesbaden however suffered much less than Frankfurt from air bombing. There is a persistent rumour that the U.S. Army Air Force spared the town with the intention of turning it into a postwar HQ, but USAAF sources claim this to be a myth, arguing that Wiesbaden's economic and strategic importance simply did not justify more bombing. Wiesbaden was host to the Headquarters, U.S. Air Forces, Europe based at the former Lindsey Air Station from 1953 to 1973.

American armed forces have been present in Wiesbaden since World War II. The U.S. 1st Armored Division was headquartered at the Wiesbaden Army Airfield, just off the Autobahn toward Frankfurt, until the Division completed relocation to Fort Bliss, Texas, in 2011. Wiesbaden is now home to the U.S. Army Europe Headquarters and Mission Command Center.

Bathing and gambling
Wiesbaden has long been famous for its thermal springs and spa. Use of the thermal springs was first documented by the Romans. The business of spring bathing became important for Wiesbaden near the end of the Middle Ages. By 1370, 16 bath houses were in operation. By 1800, the city had 2,239 inhabitants and 23 bath houses.

By 1900, Wiesbaden, with a population of 86,100, hosted 126,000 visitors annually. Famous visitors to the springs included Johann Wolfgang von Goethe, Fyodor Dostoevsky, Richard Wagner, Johannes Brahms, and Henrik Pontoppidan. In those years, more millionaires were living in Wiesbaden than in any other city in Germany.

Gambling followed bathing en suite, and in the 19th century, Wiesbaden was famous for both. Its casino (Spielbank) rivalled those of Bad Homburg, Baden-Baden, and Monaco. In 1872, the Prussian-dominated imperial government closed down all German gambling houses. The Wiesbaden casino was reopened in 1949.

Main sights

The Palace Square
The Schloßplatz ("palace square") is situated in the center of the city, surrounded by several outstanding buildings. The ducal palace was begun under William, Duke of Nassau. Its foundations were laid in 1837 and it was completed in November 1841 (two years after William's death). For the twenty-six remaining years of ducal authority it was the residence of the ruling family. It later served as a secondary residence for the King of Prussia 1866 to 1918. It was later used as a headquarters for French and British occupying forces after World War I, then as a museum.

Since 1945, the building has served as Landtag (parliamentary building) for the state of Hesse. The site of the palace had been that of a castle, probably from the early Middle Ages, around which the city had developed. While nothing is known of the former castle, remains of it were uncovered during excavations after World War II.

The new town hall was built in 1887.  A tile mosaic in front of the town hall shows the heraldic eagle of the Kingdom of Prussia (of which Wiesbaden was a part at the time), the coat of arms of the Prussian Province of Hesse-Nassau, and the fleur-de-lis of Wiesbaden. The old town hall, built in 1610, is the oldest preserved building in the city center and now is used as a civil registry office.

The Protestant Marktkirche ("market church") was built from 1852 to 1862 in a neo-Gothic style.

Kurhaus and Theater

The monumental Neo-Classical Kurhaus ("spa house") was built at the request of Kaiser Wilhelm II between 1904 and 1907. Its famous Spielbank (casino) is again in operation.

In front of the Kurhaus is a lawn known as the Bowling Green. To one side of the Bowling Green is the Kurhaus Kolonnade. Built in 1827, the 129 meter structure is the longest hall in Europe supported by pillars. To the other side is the Theater Kolonnade, built in 1839. It is adjacent to the Hessisches Staatstheater Wiesbaden, built between 1892 and 1894.

St. Bonifatius

St. Bonifatius, the first church for the Catholic community after the Reformation, was built from 1845 until 1849 by Philipp Hoffmann in Gothic Revival style and dedicated to Saint Boniface.

St. Elizabeth's Church
The Russian Orthodox Church of Saint Elizabeth, called Griechische Kapelle (Greek chapel) locally, was built on the Neroberg from 1847 to 1855 by Duke Adolf of Nassau on the occasion of the early death of his wife Elizabeth Mikhailovna, who died in childbirth. The architect was again Philipp Hoffmann.

Other sights
Another building from the regency of Duke Wilhelm is the Luisenplatz, a square named for the Duke's first wife. It is surrounded by Neoclassicist buildings, and in the middle of the square is the Waterloo Obelisk, commemorating the 683 Nassauers who died on 18 June 1815 near Hougoumont Farm in the respective battle against Napoleon. Apart from the palace in the center, the ducal family had a large palace on the banks of the Rhine, known as Schloss Biebrich. This baroque building was erected in the first half of the 18th century.

North of the city is the Neroberg. From the top of this hill it is possible to view a panorama of the city. The Nerobergbahn funicular railway connects the city with the hill. South of it, the Nerotalanlagen are a park along a creek, created in 1897/98 as an English landscape garden.

One of the three Hessian state museums, Museum Wiesbaden is located in Wiesbaden.

Other churches are the Bergkirche, completed in 1879 in Gothic Revival style, and the Lutherkirche, finished in 1910 in Jugendstil. The church Mariä Heimsuchung is a tall concrete landmark in the Kohlheck suburb.

Oriental Christianity is also represented with the St. Isaiah Syriac Orthodox Church on the Willi-Juppe-Straße in Dotzheim, built 2016 by Suryoye-Assyrians.

The Warmer Damm park is a 4.5-hectare park on the east side of Wilhelmstrasse and south of the State theater and Kurhaus which features a lake, a fountain, various statues, and large grassy areas. The park was created in 1859–1860 and is named after the medieval fortifications around a pond into which the warm waters of the town's 26 warm springs flowed.

Gallery

Boroughs of Wiesbaden
The city of Wiesbaden is divided into 26 boroughs: five in the central city and 21 suburban districts. The 21 suburban districts were incorporated in four phases from 1926 to 1977. The former Mainz suburbs on the right bank of river Rhine viz. Amöneburg, Kastel and Kostheim have belonged to Wiesbaden since 1945.

Inner boroughs

Suburban boroughs

Historical population

The population development of Wiesbaden is as follows:
List of largest groups of foreign residents of Wiesbaden:

Politics

Mayor

The current mayor of Wiesbaden is Gert-Uwe Mende of the Social Democratic Party (SPD), who was elected in 2019.

The most recent mayoral election was held on 26 May 2019, with a runoff held on 16 June, and the results were as follows:

! rowspan=2 colspan=2| Candidate
! rowspan=2| Party
! colspan=2| First round
! colspan=2| Second round
|-
! Votes
! %
! Votes
! %
|-
| bgcolor=| 
| align=left| Gert-Uwe Mende
| align=left| Social Democratic Party
| 29,940
| 27.1
| 41,000
| 62.0
|-
| bgcolor=| 
| align=left| Eberhard Seidensticker
| align=left| Christian Democratic Union
| 26,997
| 24.5
| 25,104
| 38.0
|-
| bgcolor=| 
| align=left| Christiane Hinninger
| align=left| Alliance 90/The Greens
| 25,849
| 23.4
|-
| bgcolor=| 
| align=left| Sebastian Rutten
| align=left| Free Democratic Party
| 11,590
| 10.5
|-
| bgcolor=| 
| align=left| Eckhard Müller
| align=left| Alternative for Germany
| 6,859
| 6.2
|-
| bgcolor=| 
| align=left| Ingo von Seemen
| align=left| The Left
| 5,336
| 4.8
|-
| bgcolor=| 
| align=left| Christian Bachmann
| align=left| Free Voters
| 3,812
| 3.5
|-
! colspan=3| Valid votes
! 110,383
! 98.9
! 66,104
! 98.6
|-
! colspan=3| Invalid votes
! 1,202
! 1.1
! 937
! 1.4
|-
! colspan=3| Total
! 111,585
! 100.0
! 67,041
! 100.0
|-
! colspan=3| Electorate/voter turnout
! 208,686
! 53.5
! 208,821
! 32.1
|-
| colspan=7| Source: City of Wiesbaden (1st round, 2nd round)
|}

The following is a list of mayors since 1945:

1849–1868: Heinrich Fischer
1868–1882: Wilhelm Lanz
1882–1883: Christian Schlichter
1883–1913: Carl Bernhard von Ibell
1913–1919: Karl Glässing
1919–1929: Fritz Travers
1930–1933: Georg Krücke
1933–1937: Alfred Schulte
1937–1945: Erich Mix
1945–1946: Georg Krücke
1946–1953: Hans Heinrich Redlhammer
1951–1954: Georg Kluge
1954–1960: Erich Mix
1960–1968: Georg Buch
1968–1980: Rudi Schmitt
1980–1982: Georg-Berndt Oschatz
1982–1985: Hans-Joachim Jentsch
1985–1997: Achim Exner
1997–2007: Hildebrand Diehl
2007–2013: Helmut Müller
2013–2019: Sven Gerich
2019– : Gert-Uwe Mende

City council

The Wiesbaden city council (Stadtverordnetenversammlung) governs the city alongside the Mayor. The most recent city council election was held on 14 March 2021, and the results were as follows:

! colspan=2| Party
! Lead candidate
! Votes
! %
! +/-
! Seats
! +/-
|-
| bgcolor=| 
| align=left| Christian Democratic Union (CDU)
| align=left| Daniela Georgi
| 1,526,381
| 23.5
|  1.2
| 19
|  1
|-
| bgcolor=| 
| align=left| Alliance 90/The Greens (Grüne)
| align=left| Christiane Hinninger
| 1,390,605
| 21.4
|  7.3
| 17
|  6
|-
| bgcolor=| 
| align=left| Social Democratic Party (SPD)
| align=left| Hendrik Schmehl
| 1,320,299
| 20.3
|  5.6
| 17
|  4
|-
| bgcolor=| 
| align=left| Free Democratic Party (FDP)
| align=left| Christian Diers
| 675,021
| 10.4
|  0.6
| 8
| ±0
|-
| bgcolor=| 
| align=left| Alternative for Germany (AfD)
| align=left| Eckhard Müller
| 423,519
| 6.5
|  6.3
| 5
|  6
|-
| bgcolor=| 
| align=left| The Left (Die Linke)
| align=left| Ingo von Seemen
| 402,735
| 6.2
|  0.0
| 5
| ±0
|-
| bgcolor=| 
| align=left| Volt Germany (Volt)
| align=left| Daniel Weber
| 246,454
| 3.8
| New
| 3
| New
|-
| bgcolor=| 
| align=left| Free Voters (FW)
| align=left| Christian Bachmann
| 163,942
| 2.5
|  1.1
| 2
|  1
|-
| 
| align=left| Initiative Pro Auto Wiesbaden (Pro Auto)
| align=left| Christian Hill
| 105,047
| 1.6
| New
| 1
| New
|-
| 
| align=left| Citizens' List Wiesbaden (BLW)
| align=left| Monika Becht
| 73,255
| 1.1
|  0.6
| 1
| ±0
|-
| bgcolor=| 
| align=left| Die PARTEI (PARTEI)
| align=left| Lukas Haker
| 51,343
| 0.8
| New
| 1
| New
|-
| 
| align=left| Independent List Wiesbaden (ULW)
| align=left| Veit Wilhelmy
| 50,920
| 0.8
|  0.2
| 1
| ±0
|-
| 
| align=left| Alliance for Innovation and Justice (BIG)
| align=left| Faissal Wardak
| 44,344
| 0.7
|  0.4
| 1
|  1
|-
| 
| align=left| Liberal Conservative Reformers (LKR)
| align=left| Thomas Preinl
| 25,988
| 0.4
| New
| 0
| New
|-
! colspan=3| Valid votes
! 83,885
! 95.9
! 
! 
! 
|-
! colspan=3| Invalid votes
! 3,597
! 4.1
! 
! 
! 
|-
! colspan=3| Total
! 87,482
! 100.0
! 
! 81
! ±0
|-
! colspan=3| Electorate/voter turnout
! 209,347
! 41.8
!  1.6
! 
! 
|-
| colspan=8| Source: Statistics Hesse
|}

Transport

Roads
Wiesbaden is well connected to the German motorway (Autobahn) system. The Wiesbadener Kreuz is an Autobahn interchange east of the city where the Bundesautobahn 3 (A 3), Cologne to Würzburg, and the Bundesautobahn 66 (A 66), Rheingau to Fulda, meet. With approximately 210,000 cars daily it is one of the most heavily used interchange in Germany. The Bundesautobahn 66 (A 66) connects Wiesbaden with Frankfurt.

The Bundesautobahn 643 (A 643) is mainly a commuter motorway which starts in the south of the city centre, runs through the southern part of Wiesbaden crosses the Rhine via the Schierstein Bridge and connect in the northwestern part of Mainz to the A60. The Bundesautobahn 671 (A 671) is a very short motorway in the southeastern part of Wiesbaden which primarily serves as a fast connection between the city centre and the Bundesautobahn 60 to serve the cities like Rüsselsheim, Darmstadt and the Rhine-Neckar region (Mannheim, Ludwigshafen and Heidelberg).

The east side is constrained by Wilhelmstrasse, created by Christian Zais. This 1,000 meter-long street is named after Duke William of Nassau (German Wilhelm), not Emperor Wilhelm II, as many mistakenly believe.

The streets of central Wiesbaden are regularly congested with cars during rush hour. Besides some areas, especially the Ringroad and not directly in the centre, and the southern arterial roads like the Mainzer Straße, Biebricher Allee and Schiersteiner Straße.

Rail

Wiesbaden's main railway station and several minor railway stops connect the town with Frankfurt, Darmstadt, Mainz, Limburg, and Koblenz via Rüdesheim. Wiesbaden Hauptbahnhof is connected to the Cologne-Frankfurt high-speed rail line by a 13-kilometer branch line. Hamburg, München, Leipzig, Dresden, Stuttgart, Mannheim, and Hanover are connected directly to Wiesbaden via long-distance service of the Deutsche Bahn. More services to locations outside the immediate area connect through Mainz or Frankfurt Airport or Frankfurt Hauptbahnhof. Regional trains and bus services are coordinated by the Rhein-Main-Verkehrsverbund.

Public transport

S-Bahn
Wiesbaden is connected to the Frankfurt S-Bahn network and served by three lines which connect Wiesbaden with the densely populated Rhine Main Region. All routes have an at least 30 minute service during the day, in the rush hour partially every 15 minutes schedule. It provides access to nearby cities such as Mainz, Rüsselsheim, Frankfurt, Hanau, and Offenbach am Main, and smaller towns that are on the way.

Bus
The city's public transportation service ESWE Verkehr connects all city districts to downtown by 45 bus lines in the daytime and 9 bus lines in the night. Five more bus lines, operated by the public transportation service of the city of Mainz, connects Wiesbaden's districts Kastel and Kostheim to Mainz downtown.

Airports

Frankfurt Airport
The airport has four runways and serves 265 non-stop destinations. Run by transport company Fraport it ranks among the world's 10 busiest airports by passenger traffic and is the second busiest airport by cargo traffic in Europe. The airport also serves as a hub for Condor and as the main hub for German flag carrier Lufthansa. Depending on whether total passengers or flights are used, it ranks second or third busiest in Europe alongside London Heathrow Airport and Paris Charles de Gaulle Airport. Passenger traffic at Frankfurt Airport in 2011 was 56.5 million.

The airport can be reached by car or train and has two railway stations, one for regional and one for long-distance traffic. The S-Bahn lines S8 and S9 (direction Offenbach Ost or Hanau Hbf) departing at the regional train station take 30 minutes from the airport to Wiesbaden Central Station, the ICE trains departing at the long-distance railway station take also 30 minutes to the central station.

Frankfurt Hahn Airport
Hahn Airport was a major base for low-cost carrier Ryanair. This airport can be reached by car or bus. The nearest train station is in Traben-Trarbach, it is ca.  from the airport, on foot. The roads are not lit.

Port
There are small container port operations nearby on the rivers Rhine and Main.

Military
Lucius D. Clay Kaserne (formerly Wiesbaden Army Airfield or WAAF) is located adjacent to Wiesbaden-Erbenheim and is home to the US Army in Europe (USAREUR) headquarters, the 2nd Signal Brigade and the 66th Military Intelligence Brigade. The airfield was one of the points of origin for flights to Berlin in support of Operation Vittles (the Berlin airlift) during the Soviet blockade of Berlin. General Clay, the commander of the US occupation zone in Germany, was the architect of the airlift.

The United States Army runs a garrison in Wiesbaden. The facilities for US soldiers and families are spread across various locations including: Aukamn, Hainerberg, Mainz-Kastel and the Wiesbaden Army-Airfield, where the names of the streets are named after servicemen and women who sacrificed their lives during the Berlin Airlift.

Economy
Wiesbaden hosts a number of international companies, which have their German or European headquarters there including Abbott Laboratories, DXC Technology, Ferrari, Federal-Mogul, Melbourne IT, Porsche, Norwegian Cruise Line, and SCA. Several German companies also have their headquarters in Wiesbaden, including SGL Carbon, Dyckerhoff, KION Group, DBV-Winterthur, and R + V Versicherung. Wiesbaden is also home to the "Industriepark Kalle-Albert", an industrial park in the southern quarter of Biebrich. It is one of the largest in Germany with over 80 companies from the pharmaceutical and chemical industries, including Agfa-Gevaert, Clariant, Mitsubishi Chemical Corporation, and Shin-Etsu Chemical. The park was founded by chemical company Hoechst AG in 1997.

The Federal Criminal Police Office and the Federal Statistical Office of Germany are both based in Wiesbaden, along with many Hessian ministries such as the Hessian State Criminal Police Office.

At approximately €77,500, Wiesbaden has the second largest gross domestic product per inhabitant in Hesse, after Frankfurt, making it one of the richest cities in Germany. The purchasing power per inhabitant is €22,500.

Culture
Wiesbaden's most important stage is the Hessisches Staatstheater Wiesbaden. Concert halls include the Friedrich-von-Thiersch-Saal of the Kurhaus. Wiesbaden has a State Library and a conservatory, where Max Reger studied and taught as a young man. Choirs such as the Wiesbadener Knabenchor, Schiersteiner Kantorei and Chor von St. Bonifatius are known in the region and even internationally.

International May Festival

The International May Festival is an annual arts festival presented by the Hessisches Staatstheater Wiesbaden every May. Established in 1896, it is one of the most distinguished international theatre and music festivals in the world. The festival features performances of plays, musicals, operas, and ballets. Concerts from a wide array of music are featured, as are artistic circus acts and modern dance presentations. Lectures, recitals, cabaret performances, and readings are also featured.

Rheingau Wine Festival
The wines and sparkling wines of the close Rheingau are presented annually at the ten-day festival in August, Rheingauer Weinwoche (Rheingau Wine Week) around the Wiesbaden City Hall, on the Schlossplatz (Palace Square), the square Dern’sches Gelände and in the pedestrian area. At 118 booths, Rheingau and Wiesbaden vintners offer their wine and sparkling wine and invite to discover the already well known and favored, but also new vintages. Every year thousands of visitors use this opportunity to get acquainted with Rheingau Riesling wines and all their various facets and flavors. Regional specialities compatible with the wines are offered as well. A diversified musical program entertains the wine festival guests. Initiated more than 30 years ago by the Rheingau vintners, this wine festival has a long tradition.

Shooting Star Market
Wiesbaden's Sternschnuppenmarkt is located at the central Schlossplatz and the neighbouring streets of the parliamentary building, old town hall, and market church. The Sternschnuppenmarkt takes place from the end of November until December 23 every year and is open from Monday until Thursday 10:30 – 9:00 pm, Friday and Saturday 10:30 – 9:30 pm, and Sunday 12:00 – 9:00 pm.

The market is related to the city arms of Wiesbaden: the colours blue and gold and the three lilies are characteristic. Four gates and an illuminated floral roof symbolizing Fleur-de-lis, consisting of twelve over ten metre high and twelve metre wide luminous lilies, emboss the Sternschnuppenmarkt.

Over 110 booths are decorated in oriental style, coloured blue and gold, offering Christmas style goods, arts and crafts as well as nostalgic carousels and a toy train. The nativity scene displays life-sized wooden figures.

Rheingau Musik Festival

From the beginning in 1988 the Rheingau Musik Festival has staged summer concerts in the Marktkirche and in the concert hall of the Kurhaus now named Friedrich-von-Thiersch-Saal.

Sport
Since 2007 Wiesbaden has been home to SV Wehen Wiesbaden, an association football team that formerly played in nearby Taunusstein. The club was promoted to the 2. Bundesliga in 2019, but relegated back to the 3. Liga in 2020.

Twin towns – sister cities

Town twinning between Wiesbaden and other cities began with Klagenfurt in 1930, one of the first town-twinnings in Germany. Wiesbaden is twinned with:

 Klagenfurt, Austria (1930)
 Montreux, Switzerland (1953)
 Friedrichshain-Kreuzberg (Berlin), Germany (1964)
 Ghent, Belgium (1969)
 Fondettes, France (1975)
 Ljubljana, Slovenia (1977)
 Kfar Saba, Israel (1981)
 San Sebastián, Spain (1981)
 Wrocław, Poland (1987)
 Tunbridge Wells, England, United Kingdom (1989)
 Görlitz, Germany (1990)
 Ocotal, Nicaragua (1990)
 Fatih, Turkey (2012)

Coat of arms
Wiesbaden's coat of arms features three fleurs-de-lys, stylized representations of the city's heraldic symbol, the lily. The blazon is: "Azure, two and one fleurs-de-lys Or".

Notable people
Kathrin Ackermann (born 1938), actress
Adolphe, Grand Duke of Luxembourg (born 1817, Biebrich Palace), reign 23 November 1890 – 17 November 1905
Norbert J. Becker (1937–2012), agricultural scientist and specialist in the area of vine breeding and viticulture
Adolphus Busch (1839–1913), founder of Anheuser-Busch
Sarah Colonna (born 1974), American stand-up comedian
Shlomo Eckstein (1929–2020), Israeli economist and President of Bar-Ilan University
Gisela Ehrensperger (born 1943), Swiss operatic soprano
Petra Fuhrmann (1955–2019), member of the Hessian Landtag
Biruté Galdikas (born 1946), Lithuanian-Canadian primatologist
Jürgen Grabowski (1944-2022), footballer
Peter Hanenberger (born 1942), automotive specialist for General Motors, previously chairman of Holden
Franz Kaiser (1891–1962), astronomer, discoverer of asteroid 717 Wisibada and asteroid 765 Mattiaca, both named in honour of the city of Wiesbaden
Wilhelm Kempf (1906–1982), Catholic theologian, Bishop of Limburg 1949–1981
Michael Kessler (born 1967), actor and comedian
Alfred Koerppen (1926–2022), organist, music pedagogue, composer and academic teacher
Otto Krebs (1873–1941), industrialist and art collector
Günther Lütjens (1889–1941), admiral and commander of the World War II naval Operation Rheinübung, aboard the battleship 
Bruce Maxwell (born 1990), American baseball player (born on a U.S. military base)
John McEnroe (born 1959), American tennis player (born on a U.S. military base)
Melody Perkins (born 1974), American actress
Emil Pfeiffer (1846–1921), physician
Bud Pierce (born 1956), American politician
Dieter Rams (born 1932), industrial designer, former head of design for Braun
Rudolf von Ribbentrop (1921–2019), captain in the Waffen-SS, recipient of the Knights Cross of the Iron Cross for bravery
Nico Rosberg (born 1985), Finnish-German racing driver, 2016 Formula One World Champion
Volker Schlöndorff (born 1939), film director
Kristina Schröder (born 1977), politician (CDU)
Henry Schwarzschild (1925–1996), American activist for civil rights and human rights
Kiki VanDeWeghe (born 1958), American basketball player, coach and executive
Valerie Weigmann (born 1989), Filipino-German actress, host and Miss World Philippines 2014 titleholder
Silvia Weiss, soprano
William IV, Grand Duke of Luxembourg (born 1852, Biebrich Palace), reign 17 November 1905 - 25 February 1912
Maria Yakunchikova (1870–1902), Russian painter and graphic artist
Schoolboy Q (born 1986), American rapper (born on a U.S. military base)

Notable residents
Peter Carl Fabergé, fled Russia to Germany, settled first in Bad Homburg and then in Wiesbaden
Alexej von Jawlensky, Russian Expressionist painter, lived there in 1922–1941 and died there
Hava Lazarus-Yafeh (1930–1998), Orientalist, scholar, editor, and educator; born in Wiesbaden.
Vladimir Nabokov, Russian novelist, poet, translator and entomologist, writes in his autobiography about his memories of his childhood in Wiesbaden
Priscilla Presley, lived in Wiesbaden with her parents. It was here that she met Elvis Presley.
Max Reger, studied in Wiesbaden
Mickey Rourke, resides in Wiesbaden at least part-time with his Russian-born girlfriend Anastassija Makarenko
Debby Ryan, American actress, lived in Wiesbaden for three years
Richard Wagner, settled in Biebrich (now part of Wiesbaden) in 1861, after the political ban against him in Germany was lifted. It was there that he began work on Die Meistersinger von Nürnberg.
Reese Witherspoon, lived in Wiesbaden with her parents
Mayte Garcia, American belly dancer, actress, author, singer and choreographer, lived here in Wiesbaden with her parents. It was here that she met her future husband, the singer Prince, backstage at one of his concert
Eno, rapper, lives in Wiesbaden

Notable visitors
In the 19th century, visitors to the Wiesbaden's famous hot springs included Johann Wolfgang von Goethe and Johannes Brahms. Brahms' Symphony No. 3 (Op. 90) was composed in Wiesbaden in the summer of 1883.
Washington Roebling, chief engineer of the Brooklyn Bridge, came to Wiesbaden—along with his wife, Emily Warren Roebling—in 1873, hoping that the warm springs would ameliorate the effects of the decompression sickness he suffered as a result of working in caissons of the bridge.
Béla Kéler, Hungarian composer, died in Wiesbaden.
Russian author Fyodor Dostoevsky, who suffered from an acute gambling compulsion, allegedly lost his travelling money in Wiesbaden's Spielbank casino in 1865. The experience became the inspiration of his 1866 novel The Gambler (Russian Игрок), set in the fictitious place "Roulettenburg". Some historians have disputed this account, saying that Bad Homburg was the location for Dostoevsky's real-life misfortune.
Wiesbaden's Bowling Green has been very popular in recent years since various open-air concerts have been held there by artists like Elton John (2009, 2011 & 2019), Rod Stewart (2009), Eric Clapton (2008), R.E.M. (2003), Sting (2001), Bryan Adams (2000), Simply Red (1999), José Carreras (1992), and Luciano Pavarotti (1993). Lionel Richie and Plácido Domingo (2nd time in Wiesbaden) have also performed there.

Rivalry with Mainz
Mainz, on the opposite side of the Rhine, is Wiesbaden's archrival – the two cities are the capitals of their respective Bundesländer, and citizens of both cities jokingly refer to those on the other one as "living on the wrong side of the river".

Fictional references
In his short story "The Horror of the Heights" (1913), Sir Arthur Conan Doyle refers to an aerial region over Wiesbaden and Homburg in which aircraft mysteriously vanish.
In the 1983 American television movie The Day After, Wiesbaden was the first city to be destroyed by a nuclear weapon during the escalating war between NATO and Warsaw Pact forces that eventually leads to a full-scale nuclear exchange between the United States and the Soviet Union.
The historical novel series Romanike (2006–2014) by Codex Regius features Wiesbaden in the Roman age, or Aquae Mattiacorum, as one of its main locations.

References

Notes

External links

Official website
The Jewish Community of Wiesbaden on the Yad Vashem website
Wiesbaden City Panoramas – Panoramic Views and virtual Tours
Photos of Wiesbaden
More Photos of Wiesbaden
Wiesbaden Daily Photos
Webcam to Wiesbaden (Remote-Control Pan-Tilt)
23 live webcams to Wiesbaden
Webcam to Railway-Station Wiesbaden
Wiesbaden U.S. Army Garrison

 
120s establishments in the Roman Empire
German state capitals
Holocaust locations in Germany
Populated places established in the 2nd century
Populated places on the Rhine
Roman towns and cities in Germany
Spa towns in Germany